István Sallói (born 26 September 1966 in Oroszlány) is a former Hungarian football player. Sallói came from a footballing family with his grandfather playing in lower divisions before later becoming a referee. His father played in the Hungarian first league at Tatabanya FC.

Playing career
Started his career at Videoton FC young team (1981) and became professional player 1986.
Played for ETO FC GYOR (1988–1989) as loan player meanwhile he served his army duty at Győr.
Returned to Videoton and became the captain and the leader in his home team. His best year was 1992-93 when he was invited to the national team and voted as the Player of the Year and finished 2nd best scorer.
He signed for Honved with the aim to be champion and get an offer from abroad. End of the year of 1994 he accepted the offer from Beitar Jerusalem.

At Beitar Jerusalem F.C. he was known as "Stefan" as the people there had a lot of difficulty in pronouncing the name "István". Played five beautiful years for Beitar and became one of the most favorite foreign player ever played for them. Although he played behind the striker role, he became the best scorer in Beitar in those years and still he is the best Israeli scorer in European competitions with 12 goals. Finished his career at Herzelya in 2000, playing for them 18 months.

Sporting director career
After his football career, he worked as the technical director of the National Team for Hungarian Football Federation. He left the federation and became the club manager (CEO) of SIÓFOK FC 2002-2004 . They promoted to first league in the first year and finished 5th position in top league next season. Although the successful seasons, the club got into financial crisis when the owner couldn't finances the club anymore. Sallói made a new business plan, releasing the expensive players and build a young team with a young coach, Aurel Csertoi. They finished the first part of the league in first place causing big surprise for everyone. Seeing his success with small club, Újpest FC, one of the biggest and most popular team in Hungary, offered him the CEO position in winter break and he took the job. Újpest FC started the second part of the league in 8th position without head coach who resigned in winter break. Sallói again, give the job to a young coach, Geza Meszoly who made excellent job with his team, winning the second part of the league and finished the 2nd place in the table at the end of the season. In 2005, when new owner arrived to the club, Sallói resigned. He moved to Diósgyőri VTK to a very popular team which was year by year in financial crisis. For that time Sallói was called in Hungary 'man who can manage the financial crisis'. He did the job again, stabilized the club and madeDiósgyőri VTK a stable mid table team. End of 2007, the new owner of Ujpest FC called him back to Újpest FC as a sport director. His task was to build a team who can win the league. Újpest FC finished in 2nd place after a year and made over 1 million euros profit on transfer fees. End of 2009, he joined to Wolverhampton Wanderers Football Club as an Eastern Europe scout. 2011 Sallói returned to Hungarian football and took a job in Kecskeméti TE as sport director until 2015. From July 2015 after Kecskemeti TE lost the licence for the Hungarian professional leagues, he signed for Dunaujvaros PASE as the sport director. In 2018 he became the sport director of the second league club Zalaegerszegi TE In the first season the team promoted to the first league after 7 years. In 2021 he moved and take the sporting director position of MOL Fehérvár FC

Personal
Sallói is the father of Dániel Sallói, who currently plays football at Sporting Kansas City.

Honours

Player
Beitar Jerusalem
Israeli Championship: 1996–97, 1997–98
Toto Cup Al: 1997–98

Individual
Hungarian Player of the Year: 1993

Manager
Siófok
NB II: 2001–02

Újpest FC
NB I: Runner Up 2003-2004, 2008-2009 
Kecskemét
Magyar Kupa: 2010–11

Zalaegerszeg
NB II: 2018–19

Individual
Hungarian Club Manager of the Year: 2004

References

Medved.M
Beitar Jerusalem
Beitar Jerusalem

1966 births
Living people
Hungarian footballers
Hungarian expatriate footballers
Hungarian people of German descent
Fehérvár FC players
Budapest Honvéd FC players
Beitar Jerusalem F.C. players
Maccabi Herzliya F.C. players
Expatriate footballers in Israel
Hungary international footballers
Association football forwards
Hungarian expatriate sportspeople in Israel
Győri ETO FC players